Beom-seok is a Korean masculine given name. Its meaning differs based on the hanja used to write each syllable of the name. There are 13 hanja with the reading "beom" and 20 hanja with the reading "seok" on the South Korean government's official list of hanja which may be registered for use in given names. The name may be spelled various ways in the Roman alphabet. One customary spelling, Bum-suk, became a source of mirth to Anglophones in the 1950s and again in the 1980s, when two South Korean politicians who spelled their name that way rose to prominence. As a result, other transcriptions such as Pom-sok came into wider use.

People with this name include:
Lee Beom-seok (prime minister) (1900–1972), Korean independence activist and later the first prime minister of South Korea from 1948 until 1950
Lee Beom-seok (foreign minister) (1925–1983), foreign minister of South Korea from 1982 until his death in the Rangoon bombing 
Oh Beom-seok (born 1984), South Korean football right back (Chinese Super League)
Cho Beom-seok (born 1990), South Korean football midfielder (K-League Challenge)

See also
List of Korean given names

References

Korean masculine given names